Sharon Robinson may refer to:

 Sharon Robinson (musician) (born 1958), American songwriter
 Sharon Robinson (cellist) (born 1949), American cellist
 Sharon Robinson (physiologist) (born 1961), British Antarctic researcher